Bovine podiatry is a branch of veterinary medicine concerned with the diagnosis and treatment of the defects of a bovine hoof.

See also
 Cow hoof
 Cowslip

References

 
Podiatry
Veterinary professions